Mary Mossell Griffin (c. 1885 – after January 1963) was an American writer, clubwoman, and suffragist based in Philadelphia.

Early life

Mary "Mazie" Campbell Mossell was born in Philadelphia, Pennsylvania, the elder daughter of Dr. Nathan Francis Mossell and Gertrude Bustill Mossell, a writer, newspaper columnist, and editor.  She came from an unusually well-educated family:  Her father was the first African-American graduate of the University of Pennsylvania School of Medicine, and a prominent member of Philadelphia's medical community. Her uncle Aaron Albert Mossell II was the first African-American from the University of Pennsylvania School of Law. Her first cousin Sadie Tanner Mossell was the first African-American woman to earn a Ph.D. in the United States, also at the University of Pennsylvania. Another first cousin was singer and activist Paul Robeson. Her grandfather Charles Hicks Bustill was a prominent abolitionist in Philadelphia.

Career
Mary Campbell Mossell taught kindergarten from 1907 to 1908 in Darby, Pennsylvania. She wrote for several newspapers, including the Philadelphia Courant, the Philadelphia Tribune, and the Washington Sun. She was president of the Harriet Tubman Association, and the Sojourner Truth Suffrage League, and she organized the Phillis Wheatley Literary Society. She was the author of Afro American Men and Women who Count (1915). In 1927–1928, she headed a national survey of black women wage earners. With Anna J. Cooper, she established a New Jersey summer camp for Philadelphia children.

Mary Mossell Griffin chaired the suffrage department of the Northeastern Federation of Women's Clubs during the 1910s, and of the legal department of the National Association of Colored Women during the 1920s. In the latter role, she took an active role in seeing an anti-lynching bill successfully through the Pennsylvania legislature. She was president of the Northeast Republican Women's Alliance in 1924. In 1940, she was selected to chair the Phillis Wheatley Monument Fund, to erect a monument at the Boston gravesite of Wheatley.

Mossell Griffin took an interest in local affairs too. In 1934, she led a successful campaign to employ black clerks at an open air produce market in Philadelphia. In 1941, she supported parents protesting about an overcrowded school in need of repairs. In 1936, Mary Mossell Griffin ran for a seat on Philadelphia's 7th Ward executive committee.

Personal life
Mary C. Mossell married Joshua R. Griffin Jr., a medical doctor from Richmond, Virginia, in 1909. They had one child, Francis Raleigh Griffin. She was widowed when Dr. Griffin died in 1931. She was still alive when her younger sister died in January 1963.

References

American suffragists
Writers from Philadelphia
Clubwomen
1880s births
20th-century deaths
Year of birth uncertain
Year of death missing
African-American suffragists
20th-century African-American people
20th-century African-American women